Lionel Baguissi (born June 5, 1974) is a Gabonese taekwondo practitioner.

He competed in the men's 80 kg taekwondo event at the 2008 Summer Olympics and was eliminated in the third round by losing to Carlos Vásquez of Venezuela 5–0.

External links
Biography and Olympic results from Sports-Reference

Gabonese male taekwondo practitioners
Taekwondo practitioners at the 2008 Summer Olympics
Olympic taekwondo practitioners of Gabon
Place of birth missing (living people)
1974 births
Living people
African Taekwondo Championships medalists
21st-century Gabonese people
20th-century Gabonese people